Frank Collins Nicholson (August 29, 1889 – November 10, 1972) was a Major League Baseball pitcher who played for the Philadelphia Phillies in . He pitched in two games, posting a 6.75 ERA and earning one game finished.

He is part of the selected group of Major League Players to play at Wahconah Park.

External links

1889 births
1972 deaths
Baseball players from Pennsylvania
Major League Baseball pitchers
Philadelphia Phillies players
Wilkes-Barre Barons (baseball) players
Pittsfield Electrics players
Elmira Colonels players
Troy Trojans (minor league) players